Stichaeinae is a subfamily of marine ray-finned fishes, classified within the family Stichaeidae, the pricklebacks or shannies. These fishes are found in the North Pacific, Arctic and North Atlantic Oceans.

Taxonomy
Stichaeinae contains the type taxon of the family Stichaeidae, the Arctic shanny (Stichaeus punctatus), and the name is based on Theodore Gill’s 1864 name for the family. The name of the subfamily comes from that of its type genus Stichaeus, which means “set in a row”, which may be an allusion to the row of black spots on the dorsal fins of the species in that genus.

Genera
Stichaeinae contains the following genera:

Dinogunellus Herzenstein, 1890 is treated as a vaild genus by Catalog of Fishes but Fishbase does not and treats the 3 species classified within it as belonging to the genus Stichaeus.

Characteristics
Stichaeinae pricklebacks are less elongated in shape than most of the other species in the family with a relatively large head which is smooth and scaleless. The anal fin has 1 or 2 spines at the origin with between 0 and 3 spines behind them. They have large pectoral fins which contain between 14 and 18 rays while the pelvic fins have a single spine and between 3 and 5 soft rays. The head has well-developed sensory canals with paired sensory pores in the supraorbital, postorbital, suborbital,and occipital regions, The lateral line system on the body is complex with many canals and branches. There are teeth on the vomerine and palatine and the gill membranes have a wide joint and are separated from the isthmus.

Distribution
Stichaeinae pricklebacks are mostly found in the North Pacific Ocean off eastern Asia and western North America but a few species extend through the Arctic Ocean into the northwestern Atlantic Ocean.

References

Stichaeidae
 
Taxa named by Theodore Gill
Taxa described in 1864
Fish subfamilies